Jaroslav Hřebík (born 16 December 1948 in Benešov, Czechoslovakia) is a Czech professional football coach and a former player.

References

1948 births
Living people
Czechoslovak footballers
Czech footballers
FK Viktoria Žižkov players
FC Viktoria Plzeň players
Dukla Prague footballers
Czech football managers
FC Hradec Králové managers
SK Slavia Prague managers
FK Jablonec managers
FK Viktoria Žižkov managers
FC Viktoria Plzeň managers
AC Sparta Prague managers
FC Dynamo Moscow managers
Russian Premier League managers
Expatriate football managers in Russia
Association football forwards
People from Benešov
Czech expatriate football managers
Sportspeople from the Central Bohemian Region